Brasityphis is a genus of sea snails, marine gastropod mollusks in the family Muricidae, the murex snails or rock snails.

Species
Species within the genus Brasityphis include:

 Brasityphis barrosi Absalão & Santos, 2003

References

 Absalao, R.S. & Dos Santos, F., 2003. A new genus and species of Typhinae (Mollusca, Gastropoda, Muricidae) from off northeastern Brazil. Zootaxa 279: 1-6

 
Monotypic gastropod genera